Thierry Bricaud (born November 8, 1969) is a former French cyclist, who is now a directeur sportif with the Groupama–FDJ cycling team. He won two professional races in his career.

See also
European Road Championships
Outline of cycling
Tour de France
UEC European Track Championships

References

External links
Thierry Bricaud on www.cyclingwebsite.net

Directeur sportifs
French male cyclists
Living people
1969 births